The 1956 1000 km Buenos Aires took place on 29 January, on the Autódromo Municipal-Avenida Paz, (Buenos Aires, Argentina).  It was the third running of the race, and once again, it was opening round of the F.I.A. World Sports Car Championship. For this event, a longer section of the Autopista General Pablo Riccheri route was removed, returning the circuit to 9.476 km in length, as it was in 1954.

Report

Entry

A grand total of 32 racing cars were registered for this event, of which 28 arrived for practice and 27 for qualifying. Although this was the first major sports car race of the year, the race was poorly supported by the work of teams. Only Ferrari and Maserati sent cars from Europe. Both teams were represented by three cars in the race. Ferrari send a Ferrari 857 S for Olivier Gendebien and Phil Hill, and a pair of Ferrari 410 S Scaglietti Spyders for Juan Manuel Fangio/Eugenio Castellotti and Luigi Musso/Peter Collins. Meanwhile, Officine Alfieri Maserati was represented a trio of Maserati 300S in the hands of Stirling Moss/Carlos Menditéguy; Jean Behra/José Froilán González and Francisco Landi/Gerino Gerini. The remainder of the field were cars from South American teams.

Qualifying

After a three-hour qualifying session held on the prior to the race, the local hero, Juan Manuel Fangio took pole position for Scuderia Ferrari, in their Ferrari 410 S.

Race

The race was held over 106 laps of the 5.888 miles, Autódromo Municipal-Avenida Paz, giving a distance of 624.162 miles (1,004.490 km). It was the winner of the 1955 race, Enrique Saenz Valiente who took an early lead from Fangio and Musso. By lap ten, both the works Ferrari had moved ahead of the privately entered Ferrari 375 Plus of Valinete.  On lap 20, Moss and Gendebien were also moving up the leaderboard.  However, with just 20 laps left Gendebien were in the pits with problems, while Fangio’s car, now in the hands of Castellotti, was also in the pits following a collision with a dog. With the retirement of Musso just after half distance, the Maserati of Moss and Menditéguy was now in a clear lead. With his car now repaired, Fangio launches a relentless pursuit of the Maserati although the distance is too great and the Ferrari’s differential explodes into many pieces.  

As a result of Fangio’s retirement, Moss and Menditéguy in car number 31, took an impressive victory, winning in a time of 6hrs 29:37.9 mins., averaging a speed of 96.116 mph. In second was the sole remaining Scuderia Ferrari of Gendebien and Hill, albeit two laps drift. The podium was complete by another works Maserati 300S, of Behra and González, who were a further three laps adrift.

Official classification

Class winners are in Bold text.

 Fastest Lap: Peter Collins, 3:26.4secs (102.7034mph)

Class winners

Standings after the race

Note: Only the top five positions are included in this set of standings.
Championship points were awarded for the first six places in each race in the order of 8-6-4-3-2-1. Manufacturers were only awarded points for their highest finishing car with no points awarded for positions filled by additional cars. Only the best 3 results out of the 5 races could be retained by each manufacturer. Points earned but not counted towards the championship totals are listed within brackets in the above table.

References

1000 km Buenos Aires
1000 km Buenos Aires
Buenos Aires